The Peshall Baronetcy, of Horsley in the County of Stafford, was a title in the Baronetage of England. It was created on 25 November 1611 for John Peshall. He was a descendant of an ancient Norman family of Peshall, near Eccleshall, Staffordshire, whose representatives were often High Sheriffs of Staffordshire and Shropshire in the 14th and 15th centuries. He was High Sheriff of Staffordshire in 1615. The title is presumed to have become extinct on the death of the third Baronet in 1712.

Peshall baronets, of Horsley (1611)
 Sir John Peshall, 1st Baronet (1562–1646)
 Sir John Peshall, 2nd Baronet (1628–1701)
 Sir Thomas Peshall, 3rd Baronet (died 1712)

References

 The Baronetage of England Containing a Genealogical and Historical Account of all the Baronets now existing Vol I, Edward Kimber and Richard Johnson (1771) pp. 188–198

 

Extinct baronetcies in the Baronetage of England